Operation Combine ( Ops Combine) was a special operation established by the Sri Lanka Army from 4 August 1989 to February 1990 as counterinsurgency operation with support of the Sri Lanka Police against the Janatha Vimukthi Peramuna (JVP) which had launched a its second insurgency in 1987.

Background

By the late 80s the Sri Lankan Government was at conflict with various Tamil and Sinhalese militant groups. The Tamil militants were active in the North-Eastern province and the Sinhalese militants were active in the South-Western province. The Janatha Vimukthi Peramuna was the most significant threat to the government as of 1989 due to their attempts to topple the government.

The JVP in 1987 bombed the Sri Lankan parliament as an attempt to topple the government. By the 1988 the insurgency came to peak and everyday, over 50 bodies were discovered on the streets.

Operation
Under orders from the newly elected President Ranasinghe Premadasa, Operation Combine was established by Lieutenant Colonel Ranjan Wijeratne, State Minister of Defence on 4 August 1989 at the height of the 1987–89 JVP Insurrection in the south of Sri Lanka. The Special Task Force was headed by Major General Cecil Waidyaratne, Army Chief of Staff with Brigadier Lakshman Algama serving as his deputy and established its headquarters at Havelock Town. The Special Task Force carried out intelligence gathering and direct action operations against the JVP, targeting its leadership. It was successful in tracking down and eliminating much of the JVP leadership which culminated with the capture and death of its leader Rohana Wijeweera on 12 November 1989.

On December 27, 1989, a special police team, led by SSP Lionel Gunathilake, arrested Saman Piyasiri Fernando along with his mother and fiance; who was a sister of JVP politburo member Daya Wanniarachchi, at Koswatte, Nawala, at a rented house owned by Mark Antony Fernando, who works at SLBC. According to the police sources, the number of military books found inside the house and some of them are not found in Sri Lankan military libraries. Lalilth Wijeyrathna, Upali Jayaweera, Ranjitham Gunaratnam, Gamini Wijegunasekara and Shantha Bandara tried to regroup. However, the government forces managed to capture them and subsequently killed them on December 1989. The leadership of the JVP was transferred to Lalith Wijerathna. It is believed that Wijerathna was captured in Colombo by a special police team from Kandy either late December 1989 or early January 1990. At a later date in January he was allegedly executed by his captors in Kandy in the last days of the operation Combine.

End of the operation

The Sri Lankan government media released on December 29, 1989, as "the leader of the JVP military wing killed along with four other cadres due to the cross fire between security forces and the JVP at their military wing headquarters, a farm located at Hedigama-Suwarapola, Piliyandala". Following the death of Wijeweera and other key leaders, the JVP insurrection collapsed and Operation Combine was terminated in February 1990 by Ranjan Wijeratne.

Notable members
MP Ranjan Wijeratne - Minister of defense, Sri Lanka
Colonel Janaka Perera - Special operations, Operation Combine
Major General Cecil Waidyaratne
Brigadier Lakshman Algama

References

Military units and formations of the Sri Lanka Army
1987–1989 JVP insurrection
Battles and Operations of the Second JVP insurrection
Sri Lankan intelligence operations
Counterterrorism
Anti-communism
United National Party
Military history of Sri Lanka